Joseph Solvinto (13 April 1902 – 13 September 1979) was a French boxer who competed in the 1920 Summer Olympics. In 1920 he was eliminated in the first round of the lightweight class after losing his fight to the upcoming gold medalist Samuel Mosberg.

References

External links
Profile at Sports-Reference.com

1902 births
1979 deaths
Lightweight boxers
Olympic boxers of France
Boxers at the 1920 Summer Olympics
French male boxers